Carnegie Mellon Silicon Valley is a degree-granting branch campus of Carnegie Mellon University located in the heart of Silicon Valley in Mountain View, California. It was established in 2002 at the NASA Ames Research Center in Moffett Field.

The campus offers full-time and part-time professional Masters programs in Electrical And Computer Engineering, Software Engineering and Software Management, various bi-coastal (split-time between Pittsburgh and Silicon Valley) Masters programs in Information Technology, and a bi-coastal Ph.D. program in Electrical and Computer Engineering.  One key differentiator between programs in the traditional Pittsburgh campus and the new Silicon Valley campus is a new focus on project-centered learning by doing approach to education.

History 
After years of planning from the Pittsburgh campus, Carnegie Mellon Silicon Valley opened in September 2002 under the name "Carnegie Mellon University - West Campus" to an original class of 56 students. James H. Morris, the Dean of the School of Computer Science at the Pittsburgh campus, was instrumental in establishing the West Coast initiative and served as the new campus' first dean. Raj Reddy, a Turing Award recipient and computer science professor at the Pittsburgh campus, was the school's first director. In 2008, the university's name was changed to Carnegie Mellon Silicon Valley to better reflect the proximity to Silicon Valley.  In 2009, Dean Morris ended his appointment, and the College of Engineering (also known as Carnegie Institute of Technology or "CIT") at Carnegie Mellon University partnered with the Silicon Valley campus to bring more resources and a stronger connection to the main campus.  In 2022, Carnegie Mellon Silicon Valley celebrated its 20th anniversary.

Location 

Carnegie Mellon Silicon Valley is located on NASA's Ames Research Center in Moffett Field. The campus (or in particular Moffett Field), is surrounded by high-tech companies such as Google, Microsoft, Yahoo, HP, and Lockheed Martin. Carnegie Mellon Silicon Valley currently occupies Building 23 and since January 2011, a wing in Building 19, which provides space for full-time masters students, faculty and researchers. An extension for Building 19 has been in use since Fall 2012.

Programs

Master of Science in Software Engineering (MS-SE) 

In Fall 2002, Carnegie Mellon initiated a full-time and part-time Master of Science in Software Engineering degree. This program is offered under the Electrical and Computer Engineering department, and is only offered at the Silicon Valley campus. It focuses on software engineering principles, and students are required to take courses in Software Engineering and Design, Analysis, and Systems. Through ties with local companies such as Google, Apple, Facebook, Microsoft, VMWare, IBM, Oracle, and Cisco, students often participate in internships, sponsored projects, and hackathons.

Master of Science in Software Management (MSSM) 

In Fall 2008, Carnegie Mellon initiated the Software Management Masters program. The program targets senior software developers and managers that wish to pursue senior management and executive careers.  The full-time MSSM program focuses on Product Management, Strategy Development, Entrepreneurship, Enterprise Innovation, and Service Management.

For several years, Carnegie Mellon Silicon Valley operated a long-distance capability to Pittsburgh's Tepper School of Business.

Master of Science in Information Technology - Mobility and Information Security (MSIT-MOB and MSIT-IT) 

In Fall 2009, Carnegie Mellon Silicon Valley initiated bi-coastal master's degree programs in Information Technology with specializations in Mobility and Information Security through the Information Networking Institute.  In the bi-coastal programs, students are required to divide their time between the campuses in Pittsburgh and Silicon Valley and also complete an approved internship.

Master of Science in Electrical and Computer Engineering 

The Masters in ECE program has equivalent course requirements between the Pittsburgh and Silicon Valley campuses. The Silicon Valley campus offers courses in the fields of software engineering, security, wireless sensors, mobile computing, machine learning, and wireless networking.

Master of Science in Technology Ventures (MSTV) 

The bi-coastal Technology Ventures degree is an interdisciplinary program offered by the Integrated Innovation Institute. This program is aimed at entrepreneurs to gain the skills for launching a business or venture. Students are required to spend time at both the Pittsburgh and Silicon Valley campuses. Students gain knowledge of fundamental engineering and emerging technology at the Pittsburgh campus, and gain skills of business, entrepreneurship, venture management, and product innovation at the Silicon Valley campus.

Ph.D. in Electrical and Computer Engineering 

In Fall 2008, a Ph.D. program in Electrical and Computer Engineering was initiated, offering students opportunities for advanced studies and research in the fields of mobility, security, and wireless sensors and networking.

Student population 
Approximately 350 students are enrolled in Carnegie Mellon Silicon Valley's academic programs. With its strong technical support for long-distance learning, about 25% of the part-time student population reside outside of the Bay Area. Due to it being located in the Silicon Valley, many local students are from companies such as Yahoo, Google, IBM, Lockheed Martin, Oracle, Boeing and Microsoft.

Over 600 alumni have graduated from the Silicon Valley campus since 2002, adding to the over 6000 Carnegie Mellon alumni working in the Bay Area.

Research 
The campus has a growing research effort, which began in 2008 as a natural growth of the CyLab Mobility Research Center.  The research primarily focused on software mobility, networking and security. CMUSV has now grown into a research community with initiatives in wireless sensors, machine learning, context area computing, security, energy technology, software and systems engineering and disaster management.

More recently, the research efforts have grown to include Disaster Management, Language Technologies, UAVs, Antenna Optimization, Health Technology systems. Research centers include the CyLab Mobility Research Center, the Carnegie Mellon Innovations Lab (CMIL), the Center for Open Source Investigation (COSI), the International Center for Advanced Communication Technologies (interACT) and the Intelligent Systems Lab (ISL).

The Disaster Management Initiative (DMI) was established in 2009 with the mission to provide technical solutions to disaster prediction, management and recovery.

Silicon Valley Events 
Besides the educational programs, Carnegie Mellon Silicon Valley has also organized software-related events in Silicon Valley, such as Carnegie Mellon's Tour de Silicon Valley, where selected Carnegie Mellon students from the Pittsburgh campus are flown to Silicon Valley for a week of networking at various software companies.

Currently, the school offers TOCS - "Talks on Computing Systems", a weekly talk given by a subject expert in various topics related to software and computing.  These talks are open to the public in addition to the faculty and students.

The school has also organized in association with the UC Berkeley, regular software conferences for software industry. The first of these took place on April 30, 2007, at the Microsoft Silicon Valley Campus and focused on The New Software Industry - Forces at Play, Business in Motion, while the second conference took place on April 22, 2008, at the Santa Clara Convention Center and focused on The Mobile Future - Technology Revolutionizing our Lives.

The campus has hosted a Disaster Management Workshop, focusing on its growing research division in Disaster Response.  The 3 day event included a crisis camp for practitioners to come and collaborate on improving disaster relief methodologies.

The Fence 

In August 2008, the graduating class of 2008 presented a gift to the university by installing their own Carnegie Mellon University fence on the Silicon Valley campus. The fence is a Carnegie Mellon tradition on the main campus where different student organizations repaint a long fence in the middle of the campus to promote a cause or spread a certain message. Members of the class of 2008 collected money to hire a contractor to build and install a 10-foot fence, that was then subsequently painted with images symbolizing the west coast (like the Golden Gate Bridge, or NASA's Hangar One). The fence was dedicated to Randy Pausch who died in 2008 (the top of the fence reads "Dedicated to Randy Pausch"). The remaining money was also donated and gift-matched to a total of $1000 to the Randy Pausch Memorial Fund.

Alumni 
Many of CMUSV's alumni go on to work in nearby Silicon Valley companies including Google and Facebook. ECE PhD graduate Heng-Tze Cheng created the wide and deep learning system for recommendation system at Google. Faculty Joy Ying Zhang and research staff of Mobile Technologies (creator of Jibbigo) was acquired by Facebook.

References

External links 
 Official Site
 Article on CMU West
 CMUSV Celebrates Its 10th Anniversary

Silicon Valley
Universities and colleges in Santa Clara County, California
Educational institutions established in 2002
2002 establishments in California
Private universities and colleges in California